Zhang Huachen (born 16 March 1998) is a Chinese footballer who currently plays for Shanghai Port in the Chinese Super League.

Club career
Zhang Huachen joined Chinese Super League side Shanghai SIPG's youth academy in November 2014 when Shanghai SIPG bought Shanghai Luckystar' youth team. He was promoted to the first team squad by André Villas-Boas in the 2017 season. On 4 March 2017, Zhang made his senior debut in a 5–1 home victory against Changchun Yatai as the benefit of the new rule of the Super League that at least one Under-23 player must in the starting. He was substituted off in the 29th minute when Shanghai was losing 1–0.

Career statistics
.

Honours

Club
Shanghai SIPG
Chinese Super League: 2018

References

External links
 

1998 births
Living people
Chinese footballers
Footballers from Shanghai
Shanghai Port F.C. players
Nantong Zhiyun F.C. players
Chinese Super League players
China League One players
Association football defenders